The 2022–23 Nemzeti Bajnokság II (also known as 2022–23 Merkantil Bank Liga) is Hungary's 72nd season of the Nemzeti Bajnokság II, the second tier of the Hungarian football league system. The season began in July 2022.

Teams
The following teams have changed division since the 2021–22 season.

Team changes

To NB II

From NB II

Stadium and locations

Following is the list of clubs competing in the league this season, with their location, stadium and stadium capacity.

League table

Standings

Hat-tricks

See also
 2022–23 Magyar Kupa
 2022–23 Nemzeti Bajnokság I
 2022–23 Nemzeti Bajnokság III
 2022–23 Megyei Bajnokság I

References

External links
  
  

Nemzeti Bajnokság II seasons
2022–23 in Hungarian football
Hun
Current association football seasons